The Narok Newspaper Edition (NNE) is an online newspaper based in  Narok County, Kenya, owned by the Maasai Media Group. The newspaper was launched in 2012 and publishes first-hand information and provide 24-hour news update about Narok County while also publishing on important national and international happenings. 
 
While the Maasai Media Group has numerous affiliates, NNE is primarily core covering all the six constituencies in the County and all the 30 wards in Narok County.

Newspapers published in Kenya